Stavros Christodoulou is a Cypriot writer. He was born in 1963 in Nicosia. He studied law in Athens, and worked as a journalist afterwards. He is a columnist for the leading Cypriot newspaper Phileleftheros. 

His first book Hotel National (2016) was shortlisted for the Cyprus State Literature Prize. His second book The Day the River Froze (2018) won the Cyprus State Literature Prize and the EU Prize for Literature.

References

Cypriot writers
People from Nicosia
1963 births
Living people
Date of birth missing (living people)